I'm In Love With Your Mom is an EP by Angry Samoans containing all six tracks from their first recording session in September 1978.

Track listing
"I'm in Love with Your Mom" - 2:56 (R. Meltzer/M. Saunders/G. Turner/D. Roeder)
"My Old Man's a Fatso" - 2:55 (M. Saunders)
"Carson Girls" - 2:47 (M. Saunders)
"I'm a Pig" - 2:18 (M. Saunders/P. Murray)
"Too Animalistic" - 2:29 (G. Turner/Guzman)
"Right Side of My Mind" - 2:43 (M. Saunders)

Personnel
"Metal Mike" Saunders - vocals, guitar
 Bonze Blayk - lead guitar, mastering
Gregg Turner - vocals
Todd Homer - bass
Bill Vockeroth - drums
Lloyd James - engineer

Online
YouTube - "I'M IN LOVE WITH YOUR MOM" - Official remaster of 6-song 1978 Demo Tape by BAD TRIP RECORDS

References

1978 EPs
Angry Samoans albums
Bad Trip Records EPs